Penny Meredith is a British actress.

Selected filmography
 The Flesh and Blood Show (1972)
 Go for a Take (1972)
 The Best of Benny Hill (1974)
 The Ups and Downs of a Handyman (1975)
 Confessions from a Holiday Camp (1977)
 Night Train to Murder (1983)

Television roles
 Man at the Top
 The Benny Hill Show

References

External links
 

Living people
British film actresses
British television actresses
Year of birth missing (living people)
Place of birth missing (living people)